Leontochroma viridochraceum is a species of moth of the family Tortricidae. It is found in India (Sikkim) and Nepal.

References

	

Moths described in 1900
Archipini